Fourth Cliff Military Reservation was a World War II coastal defense site located near Scituate, Massachusetts, USA. It is now a recreation area for Hanscom Air Force Base.

History
The Fourth Cliff Military Reservation was built on private land during World War II, and was organizationally part of the Harbor Defenses of Boston. It consisted of an early radar, fire control towers, and artillery batteries and today, a combination of three one- and two-bedroom recreational lodging facilities. One battery of two 6-inch guns was built here, on shielded barbette carriages with a magazine and fire control bunker between them. It was known as Battery 208 and was completed in November 1944. A 16-inch gun battery, Battery 106, was planned for the Flowers Hill area but was never built. The guns were scrapped and the fort abandoned as a coast defense installation in 1948.

The site today
It is a  seaside recreation area located in Humarock (near Scituate) on Massachusetts' South Shore. Fourth Cliff is in a superb location, sitting high on a cliff at the end of a peninsula, overlooking the Atlantic Ocean on one side and the scenic North River on the other.  The site today consists of various buildings, a bunker, two fire control towers, a recreation hall, four 3-bedroom cottages, eleven 2-bedroom chalets, two townhouses, four efficiency units, eleven RV sites, a pavilion and spaces for tent camping. It is now operated by Hanscom Air Force Base as a military recreation area.  The site is open only to service members, their families, guests, and Department of Defense civilians.

See also
 Seacoast defense in the United States
 United States Army Coast Artillery Corps
 List of military installations in Massachusetts

References

External links
 Hanscom AFB official site
 Hanscom AFB support services site
 List of all US coastal forts and batteries at the Coast Defense Study Group, Inc. website
 FortWiki, lists most CONUS and Canadian forts

Installations of the U.S. Army in Massachusetts
Installations of the United States Air Force in Massachusetts
Fourth Cliff
Scituate, Massachusetts
Buildings and structures in Plymouth County, Massachusetts